Pechs-de-l'Espérance is a commune in the Dordogne department in Nouvelle-Aquitaine in southwestern France. It is the result of the merger, on 1 January 2022, of the communes of Cazoulès, Orliaguet and Peyrillac-et-Millac.

See also
Communes of the Dordogne department

References

Communes of Dordogne
2022 establishments in France
States and territories established in 2022